Uprooting may refer to:
 in the context of agriculture, the removing of a plant (tree uprooting)
 In the context of French wine production, the destroying of less desirable vineyards : see Vine pull schemes
 in the context of human migration, a possible synonym for exile

See also 
 Wykorzenienie (Uprooting in Polish)